Ricardo Jacob Israel Zipper (born 7 October 1950) is a Chilean lawyer and academician. Israel was a candidate for President of Chile in 2013, representing the Regionalist Party of the Independents (PRI), but lost the election obtaining 0.57 per cent of the vote.

Biography
Israel is married to Sara Cofré, has two children (Daniela and Igal), and three grandsons (Vicente, Julián, and Dalia). He completed his university studies in 1981 at the Law Faculty of the University of Chile, becoming a lawyer. He has a master in Latin American Government and Politics, and a doctorate in political science at the University of Essex, and a degree in law at the University of Barcelona.

References

External links

Curriculum Vitae

1950 births
Living people
University of Chile alumni
Alumni of the University of Essex
University of Barcelona alumni
Chilean political scientists
Chilean Jews
Academic staff of the University of Chile
University of Pittsburgh faculty
Academics of the University of Essex
Wheaton College (Massachusetts) faculty
University of Texas at Austin faculty
Independent Regionalist Party politicians
Candidates for President of Chile
People from Los Ángeles, Chile
Chilean political commentators